Tylomelania centaurus is a species of freshwater snail with an operculum, an aquatic gastropod mollusk in the family Pachychilidae.

Distribution 
This species occurs in Lake Poso, Sulawesi, Indonesia.

Description 
The shell has 7.5 whorls.

Ecology 
Tylomelania centaurus is a lacustrine species.

References

centaurus
Gastropods described in 1898